Kopek, also spelled kopeck or copeck in English, is a (typically one-one hundredth) subdivision of several currencies.

Kopek or Köpek may also refer to:

Currencies 
Russian ruble (kopeyka, plural kopeyki)
Belarusian ruble (kapeyka, plural kapeyki)
Ukrainian hryvnia (kopiyka, plural kopiyki)
Transnistrian ruble (kopiyka, plural kopiyki)

Bands 
 Kopek (band), an Irish rock band
 Islak Köpek, a Turkish free improvisation band

Other uses 
 Sa'd al-Din Köpek (died 1240), court administrator under Seljuq Sultans of Rum
 Köpek, the Türkçe word for dog
 Kopek, Malay words and accents for breasts, peel, and small wallet

See also
 Copic, a brand of refillable markers and related products
 Cent (disambiguation)
 Kopec (disambiguation)
 Ruble (disambiguation)